Ryan Joseph Holle (born November 17, 1982) is an American convict found guilty in 2004 of first-degree murder under the felony murder rule for lending his car to a friend after the friend and others at a party discussed their plans to steal drugs and money and beat up the 18-year-old daughter of Christine Snyder. A former resident of Pensacola, Florida, United States, he is now serving a sentence of 25 years at the Marion Correctional Facility after his life without the possibility of parole sentence was commuted by Governor Rick Scott.

Details of murder
On the early morning of March 10, 2003, after a night of partying, Holle lent his car to a friend and housemate, William Allen, Jr. Allen used the car to drop three men off at the house of Christine Snyder, where they removed a safe containing  of marijuana and US$425. During the burglary, one of the men, Charles Miller, Jr., used a shotgun he had found in the house to bludgeon Jessica Snyder to death.

Convictions
Prosecutors sought the death penalty for Charles Miller, Jr., who confessed to the killing; but he was sentenced to life without parole on May 12, 2005. The two men who entered the Snyders' home with him each received the same sentence, as did the driver, William Allen, Jr.

Christine Snyder was sentenced to three years in prison for marijuana possession.

Application of felony murder rule
Holle, who had given the police statements in which he seemed to admit knowing about the burglary, was convicted on August 3, 2004, of first-degree murder under a legal doctrine known as the felony murder rule. The doctrine broadens murder liability for participants in violent felonies to include a killing by an accomplice. As the prosecutor David Rimmer explained: "No car, no murder." The victim's father, Terry Snyder, concurred: "It never would have happened unless Ryan Holle had lent the car. It was as good as if he was there."

Statements in defense
Allen said in a pretrial deposition that all Holle did "was to say, 'Use the car.' I mean, nobody really knew that girl was going to get killed. It was not in the plans to go kill somebody, you know." Holle had no criminal record. He had lent his car to Allen countless times before. In a 2007 interview with The New York Times, Holle stated that "I honestly thought they were going to get food," adding that "When they actually mentioned what was going on, I thought it was a joke." He added that he was naive, and had been drinking all night, so he "didn't understand what was going on."

Trial
Holle was the only involved person to be offered a plea bargain that might have led to a sentence of only 10 years, but he refused the deal. Holle's trial lasted one day, including testimony, jury deliberations, conviction, and sentencing. On June 24, 2015, Holle's sentence was reduced by Governor Rick Scott to 25 years in prison and 10 years of probation. Holle's projected release date is June 30, 2024.

See also
 Felony murder rule (Florida)

References

1982 births
Living people
American people convicted of murder
American prisoners sentenced to life imprisonment
People from Pensacola, Florida
People convicted of murder by Florida
Prisoners sentenced to life imprisonment by Florida
Recipients of American gubernatorial clemency